Priluk is a village in the municipality of Živinice, Bosnia and Herzegovina. It is located at the southern shore of Lake Modrac.

Demographics 
According to the 2013 census, its population was 2,260.

References

Populated places in Živinice